Xia Suntong (1857–1941) was a Chinese scholar who co-authored the Draft History of Qing. A native of Jiangyin, Jiangsu, Xia became a jinshi in 1892 and was admitted into the Hanlin Academy. He was also a prolific painter and poet.

References

Citations

Bibliography

 

1857 births
1941 deaths
19th-century Chinese historians